The 1946 Nevada Wolf Pack football team was an American football team that represented the University of Nevada as an independent during the 1946 college football season. In their eighth season under head coach Jim Aiken, the Wolf Pack compiled a 7–2 record, outscored opponents by a total of 324 to 82, and defeated Hawaii, 26 to 7, in the 16th annual Shrine Benefit Aloha Bowl.

The team ranked first nationally in passing offense with an average of 198.1 passing yards per game, 25 yards more on average than the second-ranked team, Georgia. They also ranked third nationally in total offense with an average of 389.3 yards per game.

In just eight games (not including Nevada's bowl game), quarterback Bill Mackrides also led the nation with 1,254 passing yards and 17 touchdown passes. His total of 1,254 passing yards on just 56 completions calculates to an average of 22.4 yards per completion. In the post-season Shrine Benefit at Aloha Bowl, Mackrides added another 189 passing yards and three touchdown passes, bringing his 1946 nine-game totals to 1,443 passing yards and 20 touchdown passes.

Mackrides, halfbacks Tommy Kalmanir and Bill Bass, end Horace Gillom, and tackle Ed Sharkey all went on to careers in professional football. Bob McClure was the team captain and also played two season in the National Football League (NFL). The team's assistant coaches were Jim Bailey, Jake Lawlor, and Dick Miller.

On January 15, 1947, Aiken resigned as athletic director and head coach and left the school to become head football coach at the University of Oregon. In eight years under Aiken, the Wolf Pack compiled a 38–26–4 record.

Schedule

Players
The following individuals played for the 1946 Nevada team:

 James Aiken Jr.
 Bill Bass - halfback
 Tom Batey
 Scott Beasley - end
 Morley Bockman
 Max Dodge
 Jordan Eliades - quarterback
 Darwin Farnsworth
 Pat Francellini
 Horace Gillom - end
 Harold Hayes - end
 Pat Heher - guard
 Tommy Kalmanir - halfback
 Ted Kondel
 Bill Mackrides - guard
 Bob McClure - tackle and captain
 Mike Mirabelli
 Bill Morris - end
 Carl Robinson - guard
 Lloyd Rude - fullback
 Ed Sharkey - tackle
 Chuck Siferd
 John Simons - end
 Ken Sinofsky - guard
 Neil Sprague
 Jess Standish - fullback
 Gene Straka - fullback
 John Subda - guard
 Bob Sullivan - center
 Don Talcott - guard
 Dick Tilton - guard
 Dick Trachok
 Jim Welin - fullback

After the season

The 1947 NFL Draft was held on December 16, 1946. The following Wolf Pack players were selected.

References

Nevada
Nevada Wolf Pack football seasons
Nevada Wolf Pack football